Air Chief Marshal Masihuzzaman Serniabat, BBP, OSP, ndu, psc (born 14 February 1962) was the 15th Chief of the Air Staff of the Bangladesh Air Force. He took over as the chief on 12 June 2018 from Air Chief Marshal Abu Esrar. He was promoted to Air Marshal on the same day. He was promoted to the rank of ACM on 30 July 2018.

Early life
Serniabat was born on 14 February 1962. He was educated at Notre Dame College, Dhaka and then enrolled at the Bangladesh Air Force Academy on 16 March 1980, graduating in June 1982.

Career
Serniabat was commissioned into the Bangladesh Air Force on 19 June 1982 in General Duties (Pilot) Branch. He flew various types of aircraft, including PT-6, Fouga, F-6, F-7, F-7 BG, F-7MB, A-5, MiG-29, YAK-130 and SU-30 MKI (A). He attended a number of courses at home and abroad. He is a graduate of the Defence Services Command and Staff College in Bangladesh, the Royal Malaysian Armed Forces Staff College in Malaysia and the National Defence University in China.

Serniabat became the chairperson of Bangladesh Air Force Welfare Trust on 12 June 2018.

Personal life
He is married to Yasmeen Zaman, and has one son and one daughter. He is an ardent reader and a keen golfer.

References

 

Bangladesh Air Force air marshals
1962 births
Living people
Chiefs of Air Staff (Bangladesh)
Notre Dame College, Dhaka alumni